is the 14th single of Japanese girl group Kalafina. The song was used as the ending theme to the anime film Puella Magi Madoka Magica the Movie: Rebellion. The single peaked at No. 4 on Japan’s weekly Oricon singles chart, having reached 37,259 units. As of 2013, Kimi no Gin no Niwa has become the best-selling single of Kalafina.

Track listing

Regular edition

Limited edition

Charts

References

External links
 Kalafina's Official Site

2013 singles
Kalafina songs
Japanese film songs
Puella Magi Madoka Magica songs
Songs written for animated films
Songs written by Yuki Kajiura